Moxa Technologies is a Taiwanese technology company specializing in edge connectivity, industrial computing, and network infrastructure solutions.

Overview
Moxa specializes in edge connectivity, industrial computing, and network infrastructure solutions. They are headquartered in Taipei, Taiwan.

History
In 2005 Moxa sponsored an international essay contest to discover novel applications of wireless device servers.

By 2005 Moxa was a $30 million dollar company, by 2008 they were a $100 million dollar company. In response to competition the company has been forced to climb the technology value chain and focus on high end products. 

In November 2018 Moxa and Trend Micro announced the formation of a joint-venture corporation named TXOne Networks which will focus on the security needs of the Industrial Internet of Things (IoT).

In 2019 Moxa teamed up with National Taiwan University to launch a research and development lab called the MOXA-NTU Networking Innovation Lab. The primary focus of the lab will be on Time-Sensitive Networking.

Moxa Americas Inc.
Moxa Americas Inc. is Moxa’s American subsidiary with headquarters in Brea, CA. Moxa Americas Inc. was founded in 1992 and employs approximately 800 people.

See also
 List of companies of Taiwan

References

Taiwanese companies established in 1987
Taiwanese brands
Electronics companies of Taiwan
Defence companies of Taiwan